Line S2 of Beijing Suburban Railway (BCR) is a commuter rail line in Beijing. The main line runs from Huangtudian railway station in Changping District to Yanqing railway station in Yanqing District, following the old Beijing–Baotou railway, and provides faster, more frequent and convenient service than preexisting trains. The train locomotives are marked "Great Wall".

Stations

Operation
A trip from Huangtudian to the Badaling Great Wall takes about 1 hour and 22 minutes. Since 1 December 2020 there have been five services each way from Friday to Monday and on public holidays. On other days there are three services. Tickets can be purchased from ticket offices of stations along route on the day of travel only. The Beijing Transit card is accepted on this route.
Train identification numbers are prefixed with the letter 'S'. The line primarily serves tourists traveling to the Great Wall of China at Badaling.

Line S2 uses the NDJ3 diesel locomotive marked "Great Wall" in a seven-car push-pull configuration (L+7T+L). Accommodation comes in 'soft-seat' class only with a 2+2 (first class) or 3+2 (second class) layout. The seats were reversible, but that feature has been removed. Between Nankou and Badaling stations, the train makes a reversal at a switch-back junction. Although all stations are equipped with high-level platforms, trains are equipped with retractable steps and can also serve low-level platforms. On-board facilities include air-conditioning and heating, toilets, hot-water dispensers and a cafe-bar selling tea, coffee, soft drinks, beer and snacks. Smoking is not permitted on the train.

Ticket 
The ticket pricing of Line S2 in Beijing administrative region is the same as that of Beijing Subway network, and 10 CNY fee is added in the interval of Kangzhuang - Shacheng. For example, the ticket price of Huangtudian - Shacheng is 18 CNY.  Special half-price ticket of children and disabled soldiers is only sold in station ticket offices.  Users of traffic cards issued in Beijing and users of QR code of Yitongxing mobile app enjoy the same preferential policy of Beijing Subway accumulated consumption discount. The ticket is not sold online.  Passengers do not need to register with their real name. Seating is on a first-come, first-serve basis. Passengers can pay the fare by Beijing Yikatong farecard, other farecards of China T-Union standard, QR code generated by Yitongxing mobile app, or purchasing ticket in station ticket offices by cash. Passengers have to show the ticket or tap the farecard or scan the QR code while getting in and leaving the stations.

References 

Railway lines in China
Rail transport in Beijing
Railway lines opened in 2008
Standard gauge railways in China